Stefon DeLeon Harris (born March 23, 1973) is an American jazz vibraphonist.

Biography

A native of Albany, New York, Harris intended to work for the New York Philharmonic until he heard the music of Charlie Parker. During the 1990s he recorded with Charlie Hunter and Steve Turre as a session musician. He signed with Blue Note, which released his debut album, A Cloud of Red Dust (1998). His second album, Black Action Figure, was nominated for a Grammy Award. In 2001 he worked with pianist Jacky Terrasson at the Village Vanguard in New York City and recorded the album Kindred with him during the same year. His album The Grand Unification Theory (2003) won the Martin E. Segal Award from Jazz at Lincoln Center.

In April 2009, he headlined at the Orange County Performing Arts Center in Orange County, California.

Harris collaborated with saxophonist David Sánchez and trumpeter Christian Scott in 2011 on the album Ninety Miles. They recorded the album in Havana, Cuba.

Discography

As a leader
 A Cloud of Red Dust (Blue Note, 1998) 
 Black Action Figure (Blue Note, 1999) 
 Kindred with Jacky Terrasson (Blue Note, 2001) 
 The Grand Unification Theory (Blue Note, 2003) 
 Evolution (Blue Note, 2004) 
 African Tarantella: Dances With Duke (Blue Note, 2006) 
 Urbanus (Blue Note, 2009)
 Sonic Creed (Motema, 2018)

As a co-leader
 Ninety Miles (Concord Picante, 2011) with David Sánchez and Christian Scott
 Ninety Miles Live at Cubadisco (Concord Picante, 2012) with David Sánchez and Christian Scott

As member of The Classical Jazz Quartet
 Tchaikovsky's Nutcracker (Vertical Jazz, 2001) 
 The Classical Jazz Quartet Plays Bach (Vertical Jazz, 2002) 
 The Classical Jazz Quartet Play Rachmaninov (Kind of Blue, 2006) 
 The Classical Jazz Quartet Play Tchaikovsky (Kind of Blue, 2006) 
 Christmas (Kind of Blue, 2006)

As member of The SFJazz Collective
 Live 2008: 5th Annual Concert Tour - The Works of Wayne Shorter (SFJAZZ, 2008)[3CD]
 Live 2010: 7th Annual Concert Tour - The Works of Horace Silver (SFJAZZ, 2010)[3CD]
 Live in New York 2011 - Season 8 - The Music of Stevie Wonder (SFJAZZ, 2011)
 Wonder - The Songs of Stevie Wonder (SFJAZZ, 2012)
 Live: SFJAZZ Center 2013 - The Music of Chick Corea (SFJAZZ, 2013
 Miguel Zenón Retrospective: Original Compositions, 2004-2016 (SF Jazz Collective, 2018)

As a sideman
 Tim Warfield, Jazz Is, A Whisper in the Midnight (Criss Cross, 1995)
 Atsushi Ikeda, Everybody's Music (King, 1995)
 Terell Stafford, Centripetal Force (Candid, 1996) 
 Joe Henderson, Porgy & Bess (Verve, 1997) 
 Charlie Hunter, Return of the Candyman (Blue Note, 1998)
 Jason Moran, Soundtrack to Human Motion (Blue Note, 1999) 
 Jacky Terrasson, A Paris... (Blue Note, 2000) 
 Greg Osby, The Inner Circle (Blue Note, 2002)
 Kurt Elling, Man in the Air (Blue Note, 2003) 
 Kenny Barron, Images (Sunnyside, 2004) 
 Buster Williams, Griot Libertè (HighNote, 2004) 
 Janis Siegel, Sketches of Broadway (Telarc, 2004) 
 Lea DeLaria, Double Standards (Telarc, 2005) 
 Diana Krall, Christmas Songs (Verve, 2005) 
 Raul Midón, State of Mind (Manhattan, 2005) 
 Joshua Redman, Momentum (Nonesuch, 2006) 
 Steve Turre, Keep Searchin' (HighNote, 2006) 
 Ry Cooder, My Name Is Buddy (Nonesuch, 2007) 
 Courtney Pine, Transition in Tradition (Destin-E, 2009)
 Diana Krall, Turn Up the Quiet (Verve, 2017)

References

External links
 
 
 "There are no mistakes on the bandstand" (TEDSalon NY2011)

1973 births
Living people
African-American musicians
American jazz vibraphonists
Musicians from Albany, New York
Jazz musicians from New York (state)
Classical Jazz Quartet members
SFJAZZ Collective members
Blue Note Records artists
Motéma Music artists
Concord Records artists
21st-century African-American people
20th-century African-American people
Jazz vibraphonists